George Nicholson (1760 – 1 November 1825) was an English printer, author, and vegetarianism advocate.

Life

Nicholson was born in Keighley, West Riding of Yorkshire, England.

Nicholson had started a printing business with his brother George and in 1797 they moved their business to Manchester. Two of their more significant works were Pious Reflections for Every Day of the Month; Translated from the French of Fénelon by John Clowes and his own book, The Conduct of Man to Inferior Animals.

Rachel Prescott of Manchester published a book of poetry in 1799 which was dedicated to Nicholson. Her dedication was based on their congeniality of mind, and on principles which can experience neither alloy nor decay.

Nicholson settled in Stourport-on-Severn, Worcestershire in 1808 where he remained until his death in 1825. He was a nationally known printer of the time. His printing press was at 15 Bridge Street and his premises are now a listed building. Nicholson was interested in animal welfare, women's rights and abolition of slavery.

Nicholson died in Stourport on 1 November 1825.

Vegetarianism

Nicholson was a vegetarian. He authored The Conduct of Man to Inferior Animals in 1797, which was expanded into The Primeval Diet of Man: Arguments in Favour of Vegetable Food: On Man's Conduct to Animals, in 1801. Nicholson's book cited Porphyry, Plutarch, Erasmus Darwin, John Arbuthnot and many others. A supplement, On Food was added to the 1803 edition, offering vegetarian recipes.

Nicholson's argument for vegetarianism consisted of five components. He argued that the earliest humans ate a vegetarian diet, and we should mimic this diet as a healthier and moral way of life. He argued that human conduct towards animals is frequently unjust and if we recognize how similar we are to other species we will treat them with more respect. He also urged for education and legislative protection for animals. The book was republished by Edwin Mellen Press with an introduction and notes by historian Rod Preece in 2000.

Selected publications

The Conduct of Man to Inferior Animals (1797)
The Primeval Diet of Man: Arguments in Favour of Vegetable Food: On Man's Conduct to Animals (1801, 1819)

References

External links

 George Nicholson from The Ethics of Diet by Howard Williams

1760 births
1825 deaths
British animal welfare scholars
British vegetarianism activists
English printers
People from Keighley
People from Stourport-on-Severn